In the decades since its creation, new varieties of the Slurpee drink have been available as tie-ins to films, video games, and other media.  The following is a list of promotional tie-in flavors, along with the dates that they were available. This list does not include themes for Slurpee cups.

See also
 List of frozen dessert brands